Tomislav Turčin (born 31 May 1997) is a Croatian professional footballer who plays for Sileks as a winger.

Club career
Born in Vinkovci, Turčin spent his youth years with several hometown clubs, mainly Cibalia. He made his senior debut for Cibalia on 28 February 2015, coming on as a substitute in matchday 19 of the 2014–15 Croatian Second Football League.

In October 2015, he signed a contract with Rijeka until June 2019. Rijeka loaned Turčin back to Cibalia until the end of the 2015–16 season. In July 2017, Turčin was sent on a season-long loan to Rudeš. He made his Croatian First Football League debut for Rudeš on 16 July 2017 against Osijek.

In June 2018, he was sent on another season-long loan, this time to Premier League of Bosnia and Herzegovina club Široki Brijeg. He made his debut for Široki Brijeg on 22 July 2018, in a 1–0 home win against league newcomers Tuzla City.

After Široki Brijeg, Turčin was again sent on a season-long loan, this time to Croatian First League club Varaždin.

Turčin scored his first goal for Rijeka on 7 October 2020 in a cup tie against Dilj.

International career
During 2016, Turčin collected five caps for Croatia's under-19 side. He scored his first international goal in the 2016 UEFA European Under-19 Championship qualifier against Scotland.

Honours
Cibalia
Croatian Second League: 2015–16

References

External links
 
 
 

1997 births
Living people
Sportspeople from Vinkovci
Association football wingers
Croatian footballers
Croatia youth international footballers
Croatia under-21 international footballers
HNK Cibalia players
HNK Rijeka players
NK Rudeš players
NK Široki Brijeg players
NK Varaždin (2012) players
GNK Dinamo Zagreb II players
NK Hrvatski Dragovoljac players
NK Aluminij players
NK Sesvete players
FK Sileks players
First Football League (Croatia) players
Croatian Football League players
Premier League of Bosnia and Herzegovina players
Slovenian PrvaLiga players
Second Football League (Croatia) players

Croatian expatriate footballers
Croatian expatriate sportspeople in Bosnia and Herzegovina
Croatian expatriate sportspeople in Slovenia
Croatian expatriate sportspeople in North Macedonia
Expatriate footballers in Bosnia and Herzegovina
Expatriate footballers in Slovenia
Expatriate footballers in North Macedonia